Ashtamangalyam is a 1977 Indian Malayalam-language film directed by P. Gopikumar and produced by K. H. Khan Sahib. The film stars Kamal Haasan, Vidhubala, Kanakadurga, Mallika Sukumaran, P. K. Abraham and Padmapriya. The film has a musical score by M. K. Arjunan.

Cast
Kamal Haasan
Vidhubala
Kanakadurga
Mallika Sukumaran
P. K. Abraham
Padmapriya

Soundtrack
The music was composed by M. K. Arjunan and the lyrics were written by Kanam E. J.

Release 

References

External links
 

1977 films
1970s Malayalam-language films
Films directed by P. Gopikumar